Joakim Våge Nilsen (born 24 April 1991) is a Norwegian football defender playing for Haugesund in the Norwegian Premier League.

Haugesund
He made his debut for Haugesund on 5 April 2009 against Tromsdalen at the age of 17 years. He played in all but one Adeccoligaen game that season, only missing the game against Skeid through suspension after being sent off against Nybergsund five days before his eighteenth birthday. The young left back was an integral part to Haugesund winning the Norwegian First Division that year.

After helping Haugesund to promotion to Tippeligaen 2010 – the first time in ten years – Våge Nilsen continued as a mainstay in the first team, missing just two games and amounting a total of 2520 Tippeligaen minutes, 93% of what he could have played. He scored his first professional goal on 21 March 2010 against Strømsgodset, the equaliser in a 2–2 draw. In September, the youngster won the Statoils talent award, an award handed to the best young player in Norwegian football every month.

Våge Nilsen signed for Odd for the 2016 season after seven seasons with Haugesund. He returned to Haugesund for the start of the 2018 season.

Career statistics

References

1991 births
Living people
People from Bømlo
Norwegian footballers
FK Haugesund players
Odds BK players
Norwegian First Division players
Eliteserien players
Bremnes IL players
Association football defenders
Sportspeople from Vestland